Aristidis Sakellariou (5 February 1911 – 1992) was a Greek sprinter. He competed in the men's 100 metres at the 1936 Summer Olympics.

References

External links
 

1911 births
1992 deaths
Athletes (track and field) at the 1936 Summer Olympics
Greek male sprinters
Olympic athletes of Greece
Place of birth missing
20th-century Greek people